Talcher railway station is a railway station on the East Coast Railway network in the state of Odisha, India. It serves Talcher city. Its code is TLHR. It has two platforms. Passenger, MEMU, Express and Superfast trains halt at Talcher railway station.

Major trains

 Lokmanya Tilak Terminus–Puri Superfast Express
 Tapaswini Express
 Puri–Ahmedabad Weekly Express
 Puri–Durg Express
 Hirakud Express
 Puri-Rourkela Intercity Express
 Mahima Gosain Express
 Angul-Puri Fast Memu Special
 Talcher-Puri Passenger Special

See also
 Angul district

References

Railway stations in Angul district
Khurda Road railway division